Bradford Rock is an insular rock, mainly ice-covered, which marks the northwest end of the Swain Islands. It was first roughly mapped from air photos taken by U.S. Navy Operation Highjump, 1946–47, and included in a 1957 survey of Swain Islands by Wilkes Station personnel under Carl R. Eklund. It was named by Eklund for Radioman Donald L. Bradford, U.S. Navy, a Navy support force member of the 1957 wintering party at Wilkes Station during the IGY.

See also 
 Composite Antarctic Gazetteer
 List of Antarctic islands south of 60° S
 Scientific Committee on Antarctic Research
 Territorial claims in Antarctica

References 
 

Rock formations of Wilkes Land